I Dreamt of a Dragon is the sixth official studio album by Serbian industrial group dreDDup. I Dreamt of a Dragon came as a surprise to their fans, with the band abandoning their aggressive style of music and going to a more electronic and commercial sound. It was recorded during the period 2013–2014 in DURU studio. The complete production and studio mastering/mixing was done by miKKa. The story about this album goes around new beginning after Nautilus story finished. The light after darkness is the main motive for dreDDup. Album cover was created by artists Blanka Pavlović and Bojana Jarošenko. This album also included guest musicians such as Mar2tA of Zbogom Brus Li , Dario Seraval of Borghesia and actress Ljuma Penov. Album is still waiting for a record deal.

Track listing
 LeedSkalNin – 1:07
 Fuck Me Like There's No Tomorrow – 4:04
 We Sperm Noise – 4:29
 Cannibal Drive – 4:29
 They Live We Sleep – 5:26
 Pussy Control Panel – 4:42
 Wet4Vet – 4:29
 TamTamTam – 4:37
 Sadam and Eve – 2:31
 Marquis de Novi Sad – 1:01
 Robots of Death – 5:15
 Etika – 4:07
 Wake Me When This world Dies – 5:09

Personnel
 Mihajlo Obrenov (aka: Inquisitor or miKKa) – lead vocals, electronics
 Ivan Francuski (aka: Frantz) – drums
 Alen Habek (aka: Armageddon) – lead guitar
 Aleksandra Vukošić (aka: XXXandra) – bass
 Dario Seraval – back vocals
 Marta Csoór – back vocals
 Ljuma Penov – back vocals

External links
 http://terapija.net/mjuzik.asp?ID=20677
 https://dreddup.bandcamp.com/album/i-dreamt-of-a-dragon-2014
 http://www.facebook.com/dreddup
 https://web.archive.org/web/20190628232033/http://dreddup.com/

DreDDup albums
2014 albums